The Triangle of Death, directed by Folleh Shar Francis Tamba, is a 2009 documentary about the Iraq War.

Plot
The Triangle of Death a cinéma vérité documentary which follows the day to day combat experiences of the riflemen of Echo 3rd Platoon from 2nd battalion 24th Marines of the United States Marine Corps, while deployed in the Iraq Sunni Triangle of Death. The film also documents the first Iraqi election in 2005 after the fall of Saddam Hussein.

‘Triangle of Death’ was a name given during the 2003–2010 occupation of Iraq by U.S. and allied forces to a region south of Baghdad, which saw major combat activity and sectarian violence from late 2004 into the fall of 2007. It encompasses several large towns in the Mahmudiya District including Yusufiyah, Mahmoudiyah, Iskandariyah, and Latifiyah. The major terrain feature of the Triangle of Death is the Euphrates River, which borders the Triangle to the southwest.

Awards
2011 - Best documentary award (Great Lakes International Film Festival)
2011 - Best documentary award Naperville Independent Film Festival
2011 - Special Jury award     (Alaska International Film Award)
2011 - Award winner (Doc)     (Love Unlimited Film Festival and art exhibition)
2010 - Aired on Military Channel
2009 - Founder's Choice Award - GI Film Festival
2009 - Winner 3rd Place - Macon Georgia Film Festival
2009 - Official Selection - GI Film Festival
2009 - Official Selection - Macon Georgia Film Festival
2009 - Official Selection - Dead Center Film Festival
2011 - official Selection - (Itzon Film Festival)
2011 - Official Selection - (Indie Spirit Film Festival)
2011 - Official Selection - (Myrtle Beach Film Festival)
2011 - Official Selection - (Other Vince Film Festival)
2011 - Official Selection - (Alabama International Film Festival)
2011 - Official Selection - (Foursite Film Festival)
2011 - Official Selection - (The Film Festival of Colorado)
2011 - Official Selection - (Interrobang Film Festival)
2011 - Official Selection - (Detroit Windsor International Film Festival)
2011 - Official Selection - (Landlocked Film Festival)
2011 - Official Selection - (Rome International Film Festival)
2011 - Official Selection - (Clearwater Music and Film Festival)
2011 - Official Selection - (Chargin Documentary Film Festival)
2011 - Official Selection - (Southern Utah International Documentary Film Festival)
2011 - Official Selection - (Southern Appalachian International Film Festival)
2011 - Official Selection - (Marbella International Film Festival)
2011 - Official Selection - (The Taxes International Film Festival)
2011 - Official Selection - (Brantford Film Festival)
2011 - Official Selection - (Great Lakes International Film Festival)
2011 - Official Selection - (The Flint Film Festival)
2011 - Finalist award     - (Las Vegas  Film festival)
2011 -  Film Market       - (Red Rock Film Festival)
2011 - Official Selection - River's Edge International Film Festival

See also
 Triangle of Death

External links

GI Film Festival - 2009 Winners

2009 documentary films
2009 films
American documentary films
Documentary films about the Iraq War
Films shot in Iraq
2000s English-language films
2000s American films
English-language documentary films